The Deperdussin TT was a French  monoplane built by Société Pour les Appareils Deperdussin, later to become S.P.A.D.  Introduced in 1912, the type was one widely used by the French Air Force (then Aviation Militaire) before the First World War.  In February 1914, an experiment was made to install a machine gun on the aircraft, but this did not see service.

A number were used by the Naval Wing of the British Royal Flying Corps, one being fitted with floats and flown from Lake Windemere.

Operators

Belgian Air Force

French Air Force

Paraguayan Air Force

Portuguese Air Force

Imperial Russian Air Service

Serbian Air Force

Spanish Air Force

Ottoman Air Force

Royal Flying Corps
No. 3 Squadron RFC
Royal Naval Air Service

Specifications

See also

References

 The Illustrated Encyclopedia of Aircraft (Part Work 1982-1985), 1985, Orbis Publishing, Page 1434

TT
Single-engined tractor aircraft
1910s French military reconnaissance aircraft
Shoulder-wing aircraft
Aircraft first flown in 1912
Rotary-engined aircraft